The Larry Sanders Show is an American television situation comedy series created by Garry Shandling and Dennis Klein and produced by Brillstein-Grey Entertainment, Columbia Pictures Television, and HBO. The show originally aired in the United States on HBO between August 15, 1992, and May 31, 1998, with 89 episodes split over six seasons. The series is set in the office and studio of the fictional late-night talk show and features Shandling as the titular character Larry Sanders, the talk show's host and namesake.

The Larry Sanders Show amassed 184 nominations for various industry awards. This includes 56 Emmy awards (with 3 wins), 3 Golden Globe awards, 8 TCA awards (with two wins), 5 Satellite Awards (with one win), 5 Directors Guild of America awards and 6 Writers Guild of America awards.

Awards and nominations

ACE Eddie Awards
Presented since 1962, the Eddie Award is an annual accolade that was created by American Cinema Editors to award outstanding achievements in editing in television and film. Larry Sanders received four nominations for the award for Best Edited Half-Hour Series for Television, winning twice for episodes edited by Paul Anderson, Leslie Dennis Bracken, and Leslie Tolan.

American Comedy Awards
The American Comedy Award, created by George Schlatter, is an award that recognizes comedic excellence in film, television, and stage. The Larry Sanders Show received nine award nominations, winning four awards.

Artios Awards
Presented by the Casting Society of America, the Artios Award is an annual accolades honoring outstanding achievements in casting. The Larry Sanders Show received seven nominations during its tenure, winning once in 1993.

American Television Awards

British Comedy Awards
The British Comedy Award is an annual accolade that recognizes the best comedic performances in film, radio, stage, and television. The Larry Sanders Show received two awards for Best International Comedy Show.

Cable ACE Awards
The CableACE Award, created by the National Cable Television Association, was an annual accolade that recognizes the best in cable television. Originally thought of as the cable equivalent of the Primetime Emmy Awards, the award became obsolete after 1997 when cable shows were included among the Primetime Emmy nominees. The Larry Sanders Show received 47 nominations during its tenure, winning 14 CableACE awards.

Directors Guild of America Awards
The Directors Guild of America Award is an annual accolade presented by the Directors Guild of America (DGA) which awards outstanding achievements in the field of directing. The Larry Sanders Show received five nominations during its tenure.

Emmy Awards
Presented by the Academy of Television Arts & Sciences since 1949, the Primetime Emmy Award is an annual accolade that honors outstanding achievements in various aspects of television such as acting, directing and writing. The Larry Sanders Show received 56 nominations, winning three awards. Rip Torn won the award for Outstanding Supporting Actor in a Comedy Series in 1996. Garry Shandling and Peter Tolan won the award for Outstanding Writing for a Comedy Series in 1997 while Todd Holland won in 1998 for Outstanding Directing for a Comedy Series.

Primetime Emmy Awards

Creative Arts Emmy Awards

GLAAD Media Awards
The GLAAD Media Award is an annual accolade bestowed by the Gay & Lesbian Alliance Against Defamation (GLAAD) that recognizes outstanding representations of the lesbian, gay, bisexual and transgender (LGBT) community in media. The Larry Sanders Show received a nomination for Outstanding TV Comedy Series.

Golden Globe Awards
The Golden Globe Award is an annual accolade presented by the Hollywood Foreign Press Association (HFPA) which honors the best performances in television and film. The Larry Sanders Show was for Best Television Series – Musical or Comedy while Garry Shandling was nominated twice for Best Actor – Television Series Musical or Comedy.

Image Awards
The Image Award, created by the National Association for the Advancement of Colored People (NAACP), is an annual accolade that honors outstanding achievement in film, television, music and literature by people of color. Penny Johnson Jerald received a nomination for Outstanding Supporting Actress in a Comedy Series.

Online Film & Television Association Awards
The Online Film & Television Association Award is an annual award presented by the Online Film & Television Association for outstanding achievement in film and television. Receiving 23 nominations during its tenure, The Larry Sanders Show won nine awards.

Peabody Awards
Awarded since 1940, the Peabody Award, named after American banker and philanthropist George Peabody, is an annual award the recognizes excellence in storytelling across mediums including television, radio, television networks, and online videos. The Larry Sanders Show won the award for the year of 1993 for its "dead-on depiction from the lines of the late-night wars." The show won again in 1998 for its series finale "Flip".

Golden Rose
The Golden Rose is an award presented by Eurovision at the Rose d'Or Light Entertainment Festival. The Larry Sanders Show won the Silver Rose for Sitcom in 1997.

Satellite Awards
The Satellite Award is an annual accolade, presented since 1997, which recognizes the best in film and television. The Larry Sanders Show received five nominations, winning the award for Best Television Series – Musical or Comedy.

Television Critics Association Awards
Awarded by Television Critics Association since 1985, the Television Critics Association Award (TCA Award) is an annual accolade that recognizes outstanding achievements in television programming and acting performances. The Larry Sanders Show has received eight nominations—six for Outstanding Achievement in Comedy, one for Individual Achievement in Comedy and the Heritage Award. The series won in 1997 and 1998 for Outstanding Achievement in Comedy.

Writers Guild of America Awards
Presented by the Writers Guild of America (WGA), the Writers Guild of America Award is an annual accolade that recognizes outstanding achievement of writers in film, television, radio, promotional writing and videogames. The Larry Sanders Show received six nominations for Television: Episodic Comedy.

References

External links
 List of Primetime Emmy Awards received by The Larry Sanders Show
 List of awards and nominations received by The Larry Sanders Show at the Internet Movie Database

Larry Sanders Show
The Larry Sanders Show